Ronan Crowley (born 1990) is an Irish hurler who plays as a left corner-forward for the Lancashire senior team.

Born in Bandon, County Cork, Crowley first played competitive hurling and Gaelic football at St. Brogan's College. He simultaneously came to prominence at juvenile and underage levels with the Bandon club, winning divisional championship medals in the minor and under-21 grades. Crowley subsequently enjoyed success with the Bandon adult team, winning an intermediate championship medal in 2011 and a premier intermediate championship medal in 2016. He currently plays with St. Peter's in Manchester.

Crowley made his debut on the inter-county scene at the age of seventeen when he was selected for the Cork minor team. He enjoyed one championship season with the minor team, culminating with the winning of a Munster medal. He subsequently joined the Cork intermediate team, winning an All-Ireland medal in 2014. Crowley made his senior debut with the Lancashire senior team during the 2017 Lory Meagher Cup.

Career statistics

Honours

Bandon
Cork Premier Intermediate Hurling Championship: 2016
Cork Intermediate Football Championship: 2016
Cork Intermediate Hurling Championship: 2011
Cork Junior A Football Championship: 2015

Robert Emmetts
London Senior Hurling Championship: 2021

Cork 
All-Ireland Intermediate Hurling Championship: 2014
Munster Intermediate Hurling Championship: 2014
Munster Minor Hurling Championship: 2008

Lancashire
National Hurling League Division 3B: 2018

Awards
2017 Lory Meagher Cup: Champions 15

References

1990 births
Living people
Bandon hurlers
Carbery hurlers
Cork inter-county hurlers
Lancashire inter-county hurlers
London inter-county hurlers